Khadija Krimi (born August 18, 1995) is a Tunisian rower. She and Nour El-Houda Ettaieb placed 20th in the women's lightweight double sculls event at the 2016 Summer Olympics.

She qualified to represent Tunisia at the 2020 Summer Olympics.

References

External links

1995 births
Living people
Tunisian female rowers
Olympic rowers of Tunisia
Rowers at the 2016 Summer Olympics
Competitors at the 2019 African Games
African Games medalists in rowing
African Games silver medalists for Tunisia
Rowers at the 2020 Summer Olympics
21st-century Tunisian women